Birgit Fischer (born 25 February 1962) is a German former kayaker, who has won eight gold medals over six different Olympic Games, a record she shares with Aladár Gerevich and Isabell Werth, spanning seven Olympiads: twice representing East Germany (interrupted by the boycott of 1984), then four times representing the reunited nation.  After both the 1988 and 2000 games, she announced her retirement, only to return for the subsequent games.  She has been both the youngest- and oldest-ever Olympic canoeing champion (ages 18 and 42). In 2004, she was chosen as the German sportswoman of the year.

Fischer was born in Brandenburg an der Havel, then in East Germany. She attended an ASK (army sports club) boarding school in Potsdam, and worked as a sports instructor in the National People's Army, attaining a rank of major by the time of German reunification in 1990.  She was married from 1984 to 1993 to canoeist Jörg Schmidt, silver medalist in the C-1 1000 m event at the 1988 Summer Olympics in Seoul. She lives with their two children in Brandenburg. In 1999 she stood unsuccessfully as a candidate for the FDP in the European Parliament election. Fischer's niece, Fanny, competed for Germany at the 2008 Summer Olympics in Beijing, winning a gold in the K-4 500 m event. Fischer's brother Frank won nine world championship medals between 1981 and 1986.

She also won 38 ICF Canoe Sprint World Championships medals between 1978 and 2005, including 28 golds. Fischer's career medal count was surpassed by Hungary's Katalin Kovács at the 2011 championships in Szeged.

Fischer is also a photographer and displays works through the Art of the Olympians.

See also
List of multiple Olympic gold medalists
List of multiple Olympic gold medalists in one event
List of multiple Olympic medalists
List of multiple Summer Olympic medalists
List of athletes with the most appearances at Olympic Games

References

 Fotographie by Birgit Fischer 
 
 
 
 Official website 

1962 births
Canoeists at the 1980 Summer Olympics
Canoeists at the 1988 Summer Olympics
Canoeists at the 1992 Summer Olympics
Canoeists at the 1996 Summer Olympics
Canoeists at the 2000 Summer Olympics
Canoeists at the 2004 Summer Olympics
East German female canoeists
German female canoeists
Living people
Olympic canoeists of East Germany
Olympic canoeists of Germany
Olympic gold medalists for East Germany
Olympic silver medalists for East Germany
Olympic gold medalists for Germany
Olympic silver medalists for Germany
Sportspeople from Brandenburg an der Havel
Olympic medalists in canoeing
National People's Army military athletes
ICF Canoe Sprint World Championships medalists in kayak
Medalists at the 2004 Summer Olympics
Medalists at the 2000 Summer Olympics
Medalists at the 1996 Summer Olympics
Medalists at the 1992 Summer Olympics
Medalists at the 1988 Summer Olympics
Medalists at the 1980 Summer Olympics
Recipients of the Order of Merit of Berlin